Marin Matoš (born 26 January 1989) is a Croatian football player who plays for Kurilovec.

Club career
Matoš had his first spell abroad with the Red Bull Salzburg Juniors. On 19 January 2016 Matoš signed a contract with Lithuanian champions FK Žalgiris. He later played for NK Lučko in the Druga HNL.

References

External links
 
 Player profile at HLSZ 

1989 births
Living people
Footballers from Zagreb
Association football midfielders
Croatian footballers
FC Red Bull Salzburg players
Újpest FC players
HNK Cibalia players
NK Slaven Belupo players
NK Istra 1961 players
FK Žalgiris players
HNK Gorica players
NK Lučko players
NK Zagorec Krapina players
2. Liga (Austria) players
Nemzeti Bajnokság I players
Nemzeti Bajnokság II players
Croatian Football League players
A Lyga players
First Football League (Croatia) players
Croatian expatriate footballers
Expatriate footballers in Austria
Croatian expatriate sportspeople in Austria
Expatriate footballers in Hungary
Croatian expatriate sportspeople in Hungary
Expatriate footballers in Lithuania
Croatian expatriate sportspeople in Lithuania